Mecom Fountain is a 1964 fountain designed by Eugene Werlin, located in the traffic circle at the intersection of Main and Montrose streets in Houston, Texas, in the United States. It was presented to the City of Houston by John W. and Mary Mecom and was the largest in the city at the time it was completed.

References

1964 establishments in Texas
Buildings and structures in Houston
Fountains in Texas